was a village located in Mugi District, Gifu Prefecture, Japan.

As of 2003, the village had an estimated population of 2,250 and a density of 56.14 persons per km². The total area was 40.08 km².

On February 7, 2005, Horado, along with the towns of Mugegawa and Mugi, and the villages of Itadori and Kaminoho (all from Mugi District), was merged into the expanded city of Seki.

Notes

External links
 Seki official website 

Dissolved municipalities of Gifu Prefecture
Populated places disestablished in 2005
Seki, Gifu

2005 disestablishments in Japan